Stamfordia is a genus of mites in the family Laelapidae.

Species
 Stamfordia carabicola Trägårdh, 1906

References

Laelapidae